Women for Trump is a political group in the United States who have supported the presidency of former U.S. president Donald Trump.

History

2016 
Women for Trump was co-founded by Amy Kremer and Kathryn Serkes in June 2016. Kremer was one of the founders of the modern-day Tea Party movement, and a co-founder of the social networking site Tea Party Patriots. She is the former director and current chairman of the Tea Party Express, a national bus tour supporting Tea Party advocates. She was a co-founder of Great America PAC in support of Trump in the 2016 presidential election.

Nationally, Hillary Clinton gained 54% of women voters compared with Trump's 42%; however, Trump outperformed Clinton among white women, winning 53% of their vote. Racial Resentment has proved to have played a significant role in why Trump was able to win the majority of white women's votes. More white women without college degrees (61%) voted for Trump. 28% of 350,000 donations made to Trump's campaign came from women, according to Politico.

2017 
The Women for Trump organization donated to the Trump campaign through the Women Vote Smart political action committee. Women Vote Smart raised more than $26,000 in 2017, according to the Federal Election Commission, but was more than $20,000 in debt as of March 2017.

2019 
Although a June Hill–Harris survey reported that 62% of women registered to vote were unlikely to vote for a Trump re-election, the Women for Trump campaign was rallying support and donations to support the upcoming 2020 elections. Politico reported in November 2019 that the Women for Trump coalition was accepting donations and seeking volunteers to push their initiative and spread their political message. The organization held a 2020 kickoff party at the Westgate resort in Orlando, Florida, on June 17, 2019.

As of December, 36.3% of Trump's donations had come from women. In the first quarter of 2019, donations were evenly split between men and women, according to available FEC data. First-quarter donations from women totaled approximately $15 million.

During the 2019 impeachment inquiry against Donald Trump, Kremer and her daughter Kylie also started a new nonprofit, Women for America First, which can raise unlimited money to rally support for the president without disclosing its donors, and were behind a "March for Trump: Stop Impeachment Now!" rally in Washington, D.C., on October 17, 2019.

2020 
Kylie Jane Kremer, executive director of Women for Trump, created the "Stop the Steal" Facebook group on November 4, 2020, the day after Election Day, as a forum for people to falsely claim that the ballot counting was being manipulated against Trump. It became one of the fastest-growing groups in Facebook's history, gaining more than 320,000 users in a day before being shut down by Facebook, which said users of the group had tried to incite violence.

2021 
Kylie Jane Kremer was named on a permit as the person in charge of the rally in Washington, D.C., on January 6 that preceded the attack on the U.S. Capitol.

References

External links
Official website

Right-wing politics in the United States
Presidency of Donald Trump
2016 United States presidential election
2016 establishments in the United States

2016 in women's history